H48 may refer to :
 , a Royal Canadian Navy River-class destroyer
 , a Royal Norwegian Navy Sleipner-class destroyer
 , a Royal Navy H class submarine